Nordic combined at the 2011 Winter Universiade will be held at the Kiremitlik Tepe in Erzurum, Turkey. The three events are scheduled for January 28 - February 1, 2011.

Events

Medals table

References

2011 in Nordic combined
Nordic combined
Skiing competitions in Turkey
2011